Levi Onwuzurike (born March 2, 1998) is an American football defensive tackle for the Detroit Lions of the National Football League (NFL). He played college football at Washington, and was selected by the Lions in the second round of the 2021 NFL Draft.

Early life and high school
Onwuzurike grew up in Allen, Texas, and attended Allen High School. As a senior, he was named the District 6-6A Defensive MVP and The Dallas Morning News All-Area Defensive Player of the Year after finishing the year with 53 tackles and 8.5 sacks. Onwuzurike committed to play college football at Washington over offers from Baylor, Arizona State and Michigan.

College career
Onwuzurike redshirted his true freshman season. As a redshirt freshman, he recorded 16 tackles, 3.5 tackles for loss and two sacks. Onwuzurike played in all 14 of the Huskies games with four starts in his redshirt sophomore season and finished the year with 34 tackles, 6.5 tackles for loss and three sacks. He was named first-team All-Pac-12 as a redshirt junior after recording 45 tackles, six tackles for loss, and two sacks with a blocked kick on special teams. In September 2020, Onwuzurike announced he was opting out of the season due to the COVID-19 pandemic and would prepare for the 2021 NFL Draft.

Professional career
Onwuzurike was drafted 41st overall by the Detroit Lions in the second round of the 2021 NFL Draft. He signed his four-year rookie contract on June 17, 2021, worth $8.14 million.

On September 10, 2022, Onwuzurike was placed on injured reserve with a back injury.

Later in the 2022 season, Onwuzurike underwent season-ending back surgery.

Personal life
Onwuzurike's parents immigrated from Nigeria.

References

External links 
Detroit Lions bio
 Washington Huskies bio

1998 births
Living people
People from Allen, Texas
Players of American football from Texas
Sportspeople from the Dallas–Fort Worth metroplex
American football defensive tackles
Washington Huskies football players
Detroit Lions players
American sportspeople of Nigerian descent